is a former Nippon Professional Baseball pitcher for the Tohoku Rakuten Golden Eagles in Japan's Pacific League. In October 2021 he was named a coach of the Rakuten Monkeys of the Chinese Professional Baseball League.

References

External links 
 

1979 births
Living people
Chunichi Dragons players
Japanese baseball players
Komazawa University alumni
Nippon Professional Baseball pitchers
People from Sagamihara
Tohoku Rakuten Golden Eagles players